Gilan Provincial League is the premier football league of Gilan Province, Iran and is 5th in the Iranian football pyramid after the 3rd Division. It is part of the Vision Asia program.

League Champions
2008–09: Malavan Sepid Anzali
2009–10: Sobhan Rasht
2010–11: Shahrdari Chaboksar
2012–13: Shahrdari Kelachay 
2013–14: Shahrdari Fouman
2014–15: Shahrdari Roudsar
2015–16: Sobhan Rasht
2016–17: Pas Gilan
2017–18: Shahrdari Astara
2018–19: Moghavemat Astara
2019–20: Sardar Jangal
2020–21: Malavan B Anzali

Teams
List of teams competing in the 2017–18 season.

 Malavan Novin
 Malavan Javan Rasht
 Esteghlal Rasht
 Mahtab Shahft
 Mirza Kochak Sowme'eh Sara
 Chay Nategh Lahijan
 Dokhaniat Rasht
 Kadous Masal 
 Sardar Jangal Sowme'eh Sara
 Shahin Anzali
 Shahrdari Astara
 Shahrdari Kelachay
 Shahrdari Kouchesfehan
 Shahrdari Rezvanshahr

References

Sport in Gilan Province
5